Howard 100 and Howard 101 are two uncensored channels on Sirius XM, a satellite radio service that broadcasts programming affiliated with Howard Stern and The Howard Stern Show. Though the channels were first broadcast on September 29, 2005 with the former company Sirius Satellite Radio, Stern could not officially broadcast until January 1, 2006, as Stern was still at WXRK, the terrestrial radio station where he had to finish his FM radio contract. A merger of Sirius Satellite Radio and XM Satellite Radio occurred in the summer of 2008.

Programming

Howard 100
, radio programs on Howard 100 include:
 The Howard Stern Show, live Monday–Wednesday (7am-11am est) with replays of Mondays and Tuesdays shows on Thursdays and Fridays.

Howard 101
, radio programs on Howard 101 include:
 The Howard Stern Wrap-Up Show, live Monday–Friday (1pm-2pm est) discussing the day's episode of The Howard Stern Show
 Sternthology, new Monday–Friday featuring nostalgic clips relevant to topics discussed on the day's episode of The Howard Stern Show

References

External links
 Howard 100
 Howard 101

Sirius XM Radio channels
Howard Stern
News and talk radio stations in the United States
Radio stations established in 2005
Sirius Satellite Radio channels
XM Satellite Radio channels